The Vagabonds (Polish: Włóczęgi) is a 1939 Polish comedy film directed by Michał Waszyński and starring Kazimierz Wajda, Henryk Vogelfänger (popular Polish Radio duet Szczepko & Tońko) and Stanisława Wysocka.

Cast 
 Kazimierz Wajda - Szczepan (Szczepko) Migacz
 Henryk Vogelfänger - Antoni (Tońko) Tytylyta
 Stanisława Wysocka - Baroness von Dorn 
 Stanislawa Stepniowna - Krysia 
 Helena Grossówna - Wandzia Karsnicka 
 Antoni Fertner - Trompka, private eye 
 Stanisław Sielański - Niusko 
 Zbigniew Rakowiecki - Wladyslaw Barski 
 Andrzej Bogucki - Roman Karsnicki 
 Stanisław Grolicki - Grandfather Galecki 
 Helena Sulimowa - Karolina 
 Helena Buczyńska - Gospodyni

Bibliography
 Skaff, Sheila. The Law of the Looking Glass: Cinema in Poland, 1896-1939. Ohio University Press, 2008.

External links

1939 films
Polish comedy films
1930s Polish-language films
Films directed by Michał Waszyński
Polish black-and-white films
1939 comedy films